Alabak Island is the mostly ice-covered hilly island in Barilari Bay on Graham Coast in Graham Land, Antarctica extending 1.35 km in east-west direction, 670 m wide, and ending in Huitfeldt Point to the east.  It is separated from the east coast of Velingrad Peninsula by a 500 m wide passage formed as a result of glacier retreat in the last decade of 20th century.

The island is named after Alabak Ridge in Southern Bulgaria.

Location
Alabak Island is located 4.74 km southeast of Vorweg Point, and 11.15 km southwest of Duyvis Point on Felipe Solo (Obligado) Peninsula.  British mapping in 1971.

Maps
British Antarctic Territory. Scale 1:200000 topographic map. DOS 610 Series, Sheet W 65 64. Directorate of Overseas Surveys, Tolworth, UK, 1971.
 Antarctic Digital Database (ADD). Scale 1:250000 topographic map of Antarctica. Scientific Committee on Antarctic Research (SCAR). Since 1993, regularly upgraded and updated.

References

 Bulgarian Antarctic Gazetteer. Antarctic Place-names Commission. (details in Bulgarian, basic data in English)
Alabak Island. SCAR Composite Gazetteer of Antarctica

External links
 Alabak Island. Copernix satellite image

Islands of Graham Land
Bulgaria and the Antarctic
Graham Coast
Uninhabited islands